Oakwood Cemetery, originally called City Cemetery, is the oldest city-owned cemetery in Austin, Texas. Situated on a hill just east of I-35 that overlooks downtown Austin, just north of the Swedish Hill Historic District and south of Disch-Falk Field, the once-isolated site is now in the center of the city.

History
The cemetery dates from the mid-1850s. It may have begun even earlier, as legend states that its first tenants were victims of a Comanche attack whose bodies were laid to rest on the same hill.

The cemetery was renamed Oakwood in 1907 per city ordinance. Paupers were historically buried in unmarked graves on the cemetery's south side. Graves without permanent markers were subject to reburial after a given period.

In 1914 the Oakwood Cemetery Mortuary Chapel was built on a design by Texas architect Charles Henry Page as a site for memorial services. The chapel was later renovated and remodeled in 1944 under the direction of local architect J. Roy White.

The cemetery became a Recorded Texas Historic Landmark in 1972 and was added to the National Register of Historic Places in 1985; its annex was added on October 30, 2003. The view of the Texas State Capitol from Comal Street in the center of the cemetery became one of the Capitol View Corridors protected under state and local law from obstruction by tall buildings in 1983. Despite its protected status, the cemetery has been subject to crime, vandalism, and decay for decades.

Notable burials
 Wilmer Allison (1904–1977) – Tennis player
 John Barclay Armstrong (1850–1913) – Texas Ranger (Hall of Fame), U.S. Marshall, and rancher. Captured the notorious killer John Wesley Hardin.
 Richard Bache Jr. who represented Galveston in the Senate of the Second Texas Legislature in 1847 and assisted in drawing up the Texas Constitution of 1845
 Thomas N. Barnes (1930–2003) Fourth Chief Master Sergeant of the Air Force
 Dr. Annie Webb Blanton (1870–1945) – First woman elected to statewide office in Texas. Served as State Superintendent for Public Instruction (1919–22)
 Albert S. Burleson (1863–1937) – United States Postmaster General (1913–21)
 Florence Anderson Clark (1835–1918) – author, newspaper editor, librarian, university dean
 Oscar Branch Colquitt (1861–1940) – Governor of Texas (1911–15)
 Susanna Dickinson (1814–1883) – Alamo survivor
 John Crittenden Duval (1816–1897) – "Father of Texas Literature"
 John Henry Faulk (1913–1990) – Radio personality
 Rebecca Jane G. Fisher (1831–1926), the only woman elected to the Texas Veterans Association and its last surviving member, the first woman to have her portrait hung in the Senate Chamber at the Texas Capitol.
 James M. Goggin (1820–1899) – CSA army officer
 Thomas Green (1814–1864) – American Civil War general
 Thomas Watt Gregory (1861–1933) – US Attorney General (1914–19)
 Andrew J. Hamilton (1815–1875) – Governor of Texas (1865–66)
 Morgan C. Hamilton (1809–1893) – U.S. Senator (1870–77)
 John Hancock (1824–1893) – Member of the United States House of Representatives (1871–85)
 Ima Hogg (1882–1975) – Philanthropist
 James S. Hogg (1851–1906) – Governor of Texas (1891–95)
 Jacob Kuechler (1823–1893) — German immigrant, surveyor, conscientious objector during the Civil War
 George W. Littlefield  (1842–1920)  –  Cattleman, banker, University of Texas Regent
 John Lomax (1867–1948) – Author and musicologist
 Hermann Lungkwitz (1813–1891) — Painter and photographer
 Henry Green Madison (1843–1912) – First African-American City Councilman of Austin
 Nimrod Lindsay Norton (1830–1903) – Confederate officer and politician, later prominent businessman
 Elisha M. Pease (1812–1883) – Governor of Texas (1853—57, 1867–69)
 Oran M. Roberts (1815–1898) – Governor of Texas (1879–83)
 Ben Thompson (1842–1884) – City Marshal of Austin
 William M. Walton (1832–1915) – Attorney General of Texas (1866–67)
 Charles S. West (1829–1885) – Texas Supreme Court justice and Secretary of State of Texas

References

External links

 Austin Chronicle – "City of the Dead"
  
  
 
 Austin History Center, Oakwood Cemetery Database 

Cemeteries on the National Register of Historic Places in Texas
City of Austin Historic Landmarks
National Register of Historic Places in Austin, Texas
Cemeteries in Austin, Texas
Jewish cemeteries in Texas
1850s establishments in Texas